Love Wrecked (also known as Temptation Island internationally) is a 2005 American adventure romantic comedy film directed by Randal Kleiser. Starring Amanda Bynes, it is a romantic comedy about a girl getting stranded with a rock star on a beach in the Caribbean.

The film was released on May 18, 2005 internationally. In the United States, Media 8 Entertainment failed attempts to interest a theatrical distributor and, after nearly two years, the film was sold to ABC Family; where it premiered on January 21, 2007.

Plot
Jennifer Taylor (Amanda Bynes) is in love with Jason Masters (Chris Carmack), a world-famous rock star, but her efforts to meet him are always thwarted by her nemesis, Alexis (Jamie-Lynn Sigler). Hoping to get another chance, Jennifer takes a job at Masters' favorite Caribbean resort, joined by her best friend Ryan (Jonathan Bennett). Jennifer sneaks aboard a party vessel Jason is on, and when Jason is washed overboard, Jennifer jumps in to save him. Though the pair find themselves marooned in a secluded cove of a seemingly-deserted island, Jennifer soon discovers that they have landed a short distance from the resort. She lets him believe they are stranded so she can make him fall in love with her.

Jennifer gets help from Ryan, who drives out to her location to provide her with supplies. When Alexis discovers Jennifer's plan by following Ryan secretly, she also pretends to be marooned with them. While Ryan has been helping, he has also decided to act on his long-standing love for Jennifer, seeking advice on asking her out. He completely transforms himself, yet when she sees him, all she talks about is Jason. Ryan confesses he can't stop thinking about her and kisses her, but when Jennifer protests that they are friends he tells her that he's going home, and drives off. Jennifer feels bad and after learning that the coast guard has called off the search for them and seeing mourning fans around the world. She tells Jason the truth about not being stranded. He gets upset at both Jennifer and Alexis, promises to sue them both, and leaves them behind as he hitches a ride back to the resort.

When Ryan hears that a storm is going to hit the side of the island where Jennifer is he drives out to save her. As the storm builds, Jennifer gets stuck in the car Ryan had abandoned to look for her, when Ryan returns just in time to save her as the car is about to slide over a muddy embankment. When he takes Jennifer into a cave and lights a fire to keep her warm, she realizes that he is the one that cares for her the most. After the storm passes, Jenny and Ryan return to the resort, where Jason and his manager tell Jennifer that they need her help to maintain the 'stranded' story at a press conference. Ryan proclaims his love for Jennifer before he is thrown out the door by Jason's bodyguard.

At the press conference, Jennifer tells everyone that her boyfriend is Ryan and that Alexis is Jason's fiancee, then walks off with Ryan. As the end-credits roll, Jason is on stage in Winnipeg, unhappily dedicating a song to his wife, Alexis, who is standing at his side.

Cast

Amanda Bynes as Jennifer Taylor, an 18-year-old fan of Jason Masters who travels to the Sun Village beach resort with her best friend Ryan to earn money for college
Chris Carmack as Jason Masters, a world-famous rock star who travels to the resort before his world tour
Jonathan Bennett as Ryan, Jennifer's best friend who travels with her to the resort and who secretly loves her
Jamie-Lynn Sigler as Alexis Minetti, Jennifer's arch-rival who also likes Jason Masters 
Fred Willard as Ben Taylor, Jennifer's father
Lance Bass as Dan, the phone operator
Alfonso Ribeiro as Brent Hernandez, the resort's manager
Kathy Griffin as Belinda
Leonardo Cuesta as Gail

Release
The original Director's Cut was premiered in 2005 at the Dominican Republic International Film Festival, held in Cofresi Beach, where the film was shot.

Love Wrecked was re-edited several times between 2005 and 2007 to tone down content, finally getting a 2007 release as a family film:
2005: Theatrical rating - PG-13 for Sexual References.
2006: Re-rating - PG for Sensuality, Crude Humor and Language.
2007: The original U.S. theatrical version of the film received a PG rating from the British Board of Film Classification for "mild language, sex references and comic violence".  It later played on the UK's Sky Movies channel.

The Region 1 DVD was released on March 13, 2007. The Region 2 DVD was released on September 17, 2007, and was the 4th bestselling DVD in it first week. In the UK, Love Wrecked was the first film released by Delanic Films, and was released on May 18, 2007. The film opened at no. 6 on the UK box office chart at 235 screens, and grossed £600,000.

Reception
Love Wrecked received generally poor reviews. On its Rotten Tomatoes listing, 17% of critics gave the film positive reviews, based on 6 reviews. Christopher Null of FilmCritic gave the film 2 out of 5 stars, stating that "Bynes has made far better films". Brian Orndorf of DVD Talk said that "Love Wrecked seems like such innocent fun until the tale drains of excitement and the Bynes batteries begin to wear down".

References

External links
 
 
 

2005 films
2005 comedy films
2000s adventure comedy films
2005 romantic comedy films
2000s teen comedy films
2000s teen romance films
American adventure comedy films
American romantic comedy films
American teen comedy films
American teen romance films
Films about singers
Films directed by Randal Kleiser
Films scored by Stewart Copeland
Films set in the Caribbean
Films shot in the Dominican Republic
Teen adventure films
2000s English-language films
2000s American films